Agia Fotia is a settlement on Crete in the prefecture of Lasithi. It is situated ~ east of Ierapetra and is known for the Agia Fotia beach (also spelled as Aghia Fotia beach) and the Church of Agia Foteini.

References

External links

Ierapetra
Populated coastal places in Greece
Populated places in Lasithi